Violin Sonata No. 19 in E-flat major (K. 302/293b) was composed by Wolfgang Amadeus Mozart in March 1778 in Mannheim, Germany and was first published in the same year as part of Mozart's Opus 1 collection, which was dedicated to Maria Elisabeth, Electress of the Palatinate and are consequently known as the Palatine Sonatas.

The work consists of two movements:

References

External links 
 Violin Sonata in E-flat major, K.302/293b – Free scores from the International Music Score Library Project

302
1778 compositions
Compositions in E-flat major
Music dedicated to nobility or royalty